The 146th Massachusetts General Court, consisting of the Massachusetts Senate and the Massachusetts House of Representatives, met in 1929 and 1930 during the governorship of Frank G. Allen. Gaspar G. Bacon served as president of the Senate and Leverett Saltonstall served as speaker of the House.

Senators

Representatives

See also
 1930 Massachusetts gubernatorial election
 71st United States Congress
 List of Massachusetts General Courts

References

Further reading

External links

 
 
 
 

Political history of Massachusetts
Massachusetts legislative sessions
massachusetts
1929 in Massachusetts
massachusetts
1930 in Massachusetts